William Dee Becker (October 23, 1876, in East St. Louis, Illinois – August 1, 1943, in St. Louis, Missouri) was the 35th mayor of St. Louis, from 1941 to 1943.

Becker, the son of German immigrants, graduated from Harvard University and St. Louis Law School. After 15 years of private law practice, he was elected to a twelve-year term on the St. Louis Court of Appeals in 1916. He was re-elected for second twelve-year term in 1928. In 1941 Becker was the Republican Party nominee for mayor of St. Louis. He defeated incumbent Mayor Bernard F. Dickmann, a Democrat, who was seeking election to a third term in the April 1941 election.

Perhaps the most significant development during Becker's term as mayor was the adoption of a civil service amendment to the City Charter.  The amendment enacted a merit system for the hiring of city employees.  Prior to that time, a political patronage system prevailed in which all city employees could be replaced with a change of partisan administration.  Becker supported the civil service reform and it was approved by the voters in September 1941.  Becker also retained Raymond Tucker, who had been appointed Smoke Commissioner by Mayor Dickmann, and supported his efforts to reduce air pollution within the city. 

On the Sunday afternoon of August 1, 1943, St. Louis aircraft manufacturer William B. Robertson was hosting the first public demonstration of a new Waco CG-4 glider, built under sub-contract by his company. As a crowd of spectators watched at the Lambert St. Louis Airport, Mayor Becker, Robertson, and other St. Louis luminaries boarded the glider that was towed by a transport plane for a flight over the city.  Immediately after the release of the towing cable, the right wing of the glider broke off, and it plummeted from an altitude of 1,500 feet, killing all ten persons on board.  Becker was buried at Bellefontaine Cemetery.  Aloys P. Kaufmann, president of the city's Board of Aldermen, succeeded Becker as mayor of St. Louis.

References 

 
 
 
 

1876 births
1943 deaths
Harvard University alumni
American people of German descent
Mayors of St. Louis
Missouri Republicans
People from East St. Louis, Illinois
Accidental deaths in Missouri
20th-century American politicians
Burials at Bellefontaine Cemetery
Victims of aviation accidents or incidents in 1943
Victims of aviation accidents or incidents in the United States